John Byron Wager (April 28, 1905 – June 22, 1982) was a center in the National Football League. He played three seasons for the Portsmouth Spartans. Previously, he played four seasons at Carthage College.

References

1905 births
1982 deaths
Sportspeople from Massillon, Ohio
Players of American football from Ohio
Portsmouth Spartans players
American football centers
Carthage Firebirds football players